mBank SA (formerly BRE Bank), set up in 1986, and originally BRE – Bank Rozwoju Eksportu (Export Development Bank), is Poland's fourth largest universal banking group in terms of total assets and loans, and fifth by deposits at the end of September 2016. It offers retail, corporate and investment banking as well as other financial services such as leasing, factoring, insurance, financing of commercial real property, brokerage operations, wealth management, corporate finance and advisory in the scope of capital markets.

Since 1992, it has been listed on the Warsaw Stock Exchange. In 2007 it started its retail operations in the Czech Republic and Slovakia.

The current mBank CEO is Cezary Stypułkowski.

mBank Group 
mBank Group is composed of:
 mLeasing, one of Poland's leading leasing companies
 mBank Hipoteczny, Poland's largest mortgage bank
 mFaktoring, an invoice factoring business
 mCentrum Operacji, a subsidiary providing back office services to other subsidiaries of mBank Group
 mCorporate Finance, a subsidiary specialising in investment banking services
 mLocum, a real property developer
 mFinanse (formerly Aspiro), a subsidiary providing financial advisory services
 mFinance France
 mElements, a subsidiary specialising in e-commerce and API banking solutions
In 2016 mBank's subsidiaries Dom Maklerski mBanku and mWealth Management become part of mBank;

Presidents
 1986–1998: Krzysztof Szwarc
 1998–2004: Wojciech Kostrzewa
 2004–2008: Sławomir Lachowski
 2008–2010: Mariusz Grendowicz
 Since 2010: Cezary Stypułkowski

History

The bank was founded in 1986 as Bank Rozwoju Eksportu (Export Development Bank), a joint-stock company. Three years later BRE Bank was granted credit lines from the World Bank and IFC and became a member of SWIFT.

In 1990, BRE Bank was privatised through public offering. The BRE Group set up its first subsidiaries: Biuro Maklerskie BRE Brokers (now mBank Dom Maklerski) and BRE Services (now mLeasing). In 1995, the bank launched its Private Banking, and in 1997 Towarzystwo Funduszy Inwestycyjnych SKARBIEC, an investment fund company, was set up. In 1999, BRE established PTE Skarbiec-Emerytura, a pension fund.

In 1994, it signed an agreement on strategic partnership with Commerzbank. In 1998, BRE Bank merged with Polski Bank Rozwoju S.A.

In 2000, BRE bank started operations in the retail banking segment, launching mBank, the first Internet bank in Poland. In 2001 it launched its second retail arm, MultiBank. In 2013, MultiBank, BRE Bank and mBank were replaced by the single mBank brand.

In 2014, mBank launched Orange Finanse, a mobile retail bank. In 2015, mBank entered into long-term cooperation with AXA Group.

Solutions offered by mBank 
 Electronic banking system: Since June 2013 the bank has been serving its retail customers through New mBank, a redesigned electronic banking platform. Customers have been offered a number of new solutions, including mOkazje, a discount programme giving access to personalised rebates, and the help of on-line experts available via chat, voice calls and video calls who serve clients in a way similar to brick and mortar branches.
 Mobile banking: In February 2014, the bank launched a new version of its mobile banking platform. The smartphone application gives access to bank accounts, cards, loans, deposits, insurance products, current share prices, currency exchange rates and investment portfolio. It also allows mobile payments (NFC contactless payments, QR code scanning, BLIK payment system) and enables customers to take out loans in 30 seconds and make money transfers using the beneficiary's phone number.
 Reorganisation of the existing network using two types of branches: light branches giving quick access to basic services, located in shopping centres, and advisory centres, bigger outlets located in office buildings.

Controversial foreign loans involvement 
mBank is one of the top three Polish banks that have been granting foreign mortgage loans. Between 2002 and 2014 mBank granted more than 70,000 such loans. A great majority of them are Swiss Franc linked. As a consequence of the financial crisis of 2007-08, Swiss Franc has significantly strengthened to Polish zloty. In case of some loans granted by mBank in 2008, their value increased twofolds.

mBank marketed Swiss Franc linked loans as much cheaper to their local equivalents. Indeed, the LIBOR rate was lower than the Polish WIBOR rate. However, when adjusted for foreign exchange effect, the cost of these loans, and especially the amount of the debt, become excessive.

mBank did not inform its clients about the full extent of the risk connected with these loans. mBank management claims it itself did not assess the risk correctly.

mBank received about 7 billion CHF in short-term loans from its parent company Commerzbank to finance its foreign mortgage loans. Initially – in 2006 and 2007 – the loans from Commerzbank were granted with a very low interest margin of 0.15%. However, the margin was increased to approximately 2.0% when they had to be renewed. Since many of the early loans granted by mBank to its customers had their margin of around 1.0%, these loans have become margin negative (i.e. unprofitable) for mBank.

For a number of years mBank was able to manage this loan unprofitability by charging debtors installment fees, so-called "spreads". These spreads were used by mBank to compensate low interest rates. However, in July 2011, the Polish banking law was amended to eliminate such additional payments.

In addition, clauses regulating linkage between Swiss Franc and Polish Zloty in the loan agreements used by mBank were found unfair and included in the unfair clauses register maintained by the Office of Competition and Consumer Protection.

Since the European Council Directive 93/13/EEC of 5 April 1993, contract terms found to be unfair should not bind consumers, the linkage between Swiss Franc and Polish Zloty present in mBank agreements was undermined.

However, mBank has not recognized the validity of this regulation. Therefore, a number of legal proceedings ensued, including a class action lawsuit started by 1,247 debtors.

One of the side effects of the raising exchange rate is growth in the loan-to-value ratio of the foreign loans. Until 2008, the average LTV ratio for mBank's foreign mortgage loans was in the 60s. Later it increased to over 80% and currently stands at 82.2%. Loans with LTV over 80% are deemed more risky, especially when the changes in LTV are not related to the property value but uncontrolled by both bank and debtor factor, such as foreign exchange rate.

As of the end of 2015, mBank held the equivalent of around 5 billion CHF of Swiss Franc linked loans and had 3 billion CHF obligations to Commerzbank.

It was announced in July 2019 that Commerzbank was being investigated by the European Central Bank and BaFin for facilitating its subsidiary mBank's toxic financial product offering in Poland, as well as for the linked potential tax evasion resulting from Commerzbank's financing of mBank's CHF-linked toxic financial products.

References

External links

 mBank Polish website
 mBank Czech website
 mBank Slovak website

Commerzbank
Banks of Poland
Banks established in 1986
Companies listed on the Warsaw Stock Exchange